Chester Springs Historic District, also known as The Old Art School, Orphan's School, Yellow Springs Spa, and Good News Buildings, is a national historic district located in West Pikeland Township, Chester County, Pennsylvania. The district includes 7 contributing buildings, 1 contributing site, and 1 contributing structure in the spa community of Chester Springs.  The district includes the old hotel and inn, two large residences, a bath house at one end of the springs, and a studio. It also includes a wooden summer house that enclosed the iron springs. The property was the site of a hospital commissioned by the Continental Congress and built in 1777.  The three-story, 106 feet by 36 feet wide building burned in 1902, was reconstructed, then burned again in the 1960s.  The Yellow Springs resort operated in the early-mid 19th century and many of the buildings date from that period.

It was added to the National Register of Historic Places in 1971.

References

External links
 Yellow Springs Tavern, Yellow Springs & Art School Roads (West Pikeland Township), Chester Springs, Chester County, PA: 3 photos, 27 data pages, and 1 photo caption page at Historic American Buildings Survey
 Yellow Springs Summer House, Yellow Springs & Art School Roads (West Pikeland Township), Chester Springs, Chester County, PA: 1 photo, 3 data pages, and 1 photo caption page at Historic American Buildings Survey
 Yellow Springs Bathhouse, Yellow Springs & Art School Roads (West Pikeland Township), Chester Springs, Chester County, PA: 2 photos, 4 data pages, and 1 photo caption page at Historic American Buildings Survey

Historic districts in Chester County, Pennsylvania
Historic districts on the National Register of Historic Places in Pennsylvania
National Register of Historic Places in Chester County, Pennsylvania